The Old Covered Bridge, also known as the Upper Sheffield Covered Bridge, is a covered bridge on Covered Bridge Lane in Sheffield, Massachusetts.  It is a replica of an 1837 lattice truss bridge that was destroyed by fire in 1994.  At the time of its destruction it was the oldest covered bridge in Massachusetts.  The bridge was listed on the National Register of Historic Places in 1978.  The bridge is open to pedestrians.

Description and history
The Old Covered Bridge is located just east of the village of Sheffield Plain, spanning the Housatonic River at the ends of Covered Bridge Lane. The bridge has two lattice trusses built to the patent of Ithiel Town, whose lower members have been doubled for added strength. The exterior is finished in vertical board siding, and it is covered by a gabled roof.

The 1837 bridge was one of the oldest known examples of a Town truss, built to an updated version of Town's patent published in 1835.  The bridge underwent period maintenance, and was closed to traffic in 1970 after the Labor Day 1969 UFO Incident.  The original bridge was restored in 1974 and 1981, and was listed on the National Register of Historic Places in 1978.  The bridge was destroyed by fire in 1994, and the replacement bridge was complete in 1996.  The fire was determined to be arson, set by local teenagers.  The bridge was rebuilt to plans that had been drawn during its restoration.

See also
 List of crossings of the Housatonic River
 National Register of Historic Places listings in Berkshire County, Massachusetts
 List of bridges on the National Register of Historic Places in Massachusetts

References

Covered bridges on the National Register of Historic Places in Massachusetts
Bridges in Berkshire County, Massachusetts
Tourist attractions in Berkshire County, Massachusetts
National Register of Historic Places in Berkshire County, Massachusetts
Road bridges on the National Register of Historic Places in Massachusetts
Wooden bridges in Massachusetts
Lattice truss bridges in the United States
Sheffield, Massachusetts